We Could Be Astronauts is the first studio album by English alternative rock band We Could Be Astronauts. It was released on October 12, 2012.

The album was mixed and produced by ex Shed Seven keyboardist Fraser Smith who is a professional producer, songwriter and musician based in London, who also works in Artist Development and A & R / consultancy.

Reviews
Sound Sphere Magazine Album Review

Whisperin And Hollerin Album Review

Track 10 from the album, 'Look Frank, It's A Toaster' received the most listeners votes on Tom Robinson's FreshNet website.

Track listing
All songs written by We Could Be Astronauts.

References

2012 albums